Christian Stahl (born May 24, 1983) is an American racing cyclist. He was a member of the 2004 US Olympic Cycling Team, and competed in the team sprint. Stahl earned his Olympic selection along with Adam Duvendeck and Giddeon Massie, who finished ninth in the World Cup overall team standings in 2004.

Palmares

2003
USCF National Track Champion, Team Sprint
5th - USCF Track National Championships, Match Sprint
6th - USCF Track National Championships, Kilometer TT
2nd - Pan American Games, Kilometer TT, Santo Domingo, DOM
4th - Pan American Games, Team Sprint, Santo Domingo, DOM
19th - UCI Elite World Track Championships, Kilometer TT, Stuggart, GER
1st - AVC #4 Pan-Am Games & Worlds qualifier, Kilometer TT, CO Springs, Colo.
1st - AVC #4 Pan-Am Games & Worlds qualifier, Team Sprint, CO Springs, Colo.
8th - AVC #3 World Cup qualifier, Kilometer TT, Frisco, Texas
1st - AVC #3 World Cup qualifier, Team Sprint, Frisco, Texas
1st - AVC #2 World Cup qualifier, Kilometer TT, Ft. Lauderdale, Fla.
1st - AVC #2 World Cup qualifier, Team Sprint, Ft. Lauderdale, Fla.
2004
Gold medal - Pan American Championships, Kilo
11th - UCI World Track Championships, Team Sprint 18th- UCI World Track Championships, Kilo 13th - UCI Track World Cup, RUS, Kilo
10th - UCI Track World Cup, MEX, Kilo
7th - UCI Track World Cup, GBR, Kilo
8th - UCI Track World Cup, GBR, Team Sprint
9th - UCI Track World Cup, AUS, Kilo
7th - UCI Track World Cup, AUS, Team Sprint
Pan American Championships gold medalist, Kilo
2005
2nd - L.A. Cycling Classic - Match Sprint
1st - Elite National Track Championships - Team Sprint
4th - Elite National Track Championships - Sprint
1st - Elite National Track Championships - Kilo TT
1st - Elite National Track Championships - Kilo TT Espoir
6th - Elite National Track Championships - - Keirin

References

External links
 

1983 births
Living people
American male cyclists
American track cyclists
Cyclists at the 2003 Pan American Games
Cyclists at the 2004 Summer Olympics
Olympic cyclists of the United States
People from Bethany, Connecticut
Pan American Games medalists in cycling
Pan American Games silver medalists for the United States
Medalists at the 2003 Pan American Games